Giuseppe Tugnoli (2 October 1888 – 13 September 1968) was an Italian champion in the discus throw, javelin throw and shot put. He competed in the shot put at the 1920 Summer Olympics and placed 14th.

National titles
He won twelve times the national championships at senior level.

Italian Athletics Championships
Shot put: 1913, 1914, 1920, 1923 (4)
Discus throw: 1914, 1922. 1923 (3)
Javelin throw: 1919 (1)
Stone put: 1913, 1914, 1919, 1920 (4)

See also
 Men's high jump Italian record progression

References

External links
 

1888 births
1968 deaths
Sportspeople from Bologna
Italian male discus throwers
Italian male javelin throwers
Italian male shot putters
Athletes (track and field) at the 1920 Summer Olympics
Olympic athletes of Italy
20th-century Italian people